The National Border Patrol Museum is located at 4315 Woodrow Bean Transmountain Drive, in the county of El Paso, in the U.S. state of Texas.

Museum
The museum was established by a 1979 vote of the Fraternal Order of Retired Border Patrol Officers. The State of Texas issued its incorporation certificate in 1980 as a 501(c) 3 tax-exempt organization. Its first location from 1985–1992 was the Cortez Building in El Paso. From 1992–1994, museum artifacts were in storage awaiting construction of a new building.

This is the only museum solely honoring the Border Patrol, and artifacts cover the agency's entire history. Among the exhibits are weapons and vehicles used, including helicopters. There is a border patrol dog exhibit, an art exhibit and an exhibit of officer badges. Depicted are various methods used by individuals to cross the border between Mexico and the United States.

Membership fees, private and corporation donations, and the purchase of memorial bricks help fund the museum.

See also

List of museums in West Texas

References

External links
The National Border Patrol Museum gift shop

Museums in El Paso County, Texas
Museums established in 1979
1979 establishments in Texas
Law enforcement museums in the United States
History of immigration to the United States
United States Border Patrol